Geranyl acetate is a monoterpene. It is a colorless liquid with a pleasant floral or fruity rose aroma. It is a colorless liquid but commercial samples can appear yellowish. Geranyl acetate is insoluble in water but soluble in organic solvents.  Several hundred tons are produced annually.

Occurrence and production
Geranyl acetate is a constituent of many essential oils, including Ceylon citronella, palmarosa, lemon grass, petit grain, neroli, geranium, coriander, carrot, Camden woollybutt, and sassafras.   It can be obtained by fractional distillation of the essential oils obtained from these sources, but more commonly it is prepared by the esterification of geraniol with acetic acid.

Uses
Geranyl acetate is used primarily as a component of perfumes for creams and soaps and as a flavoring ingredient. It is used particularly in rose, lavender and geranium formulations where a sweet fruity or citrus aroma is desired. It is designated by the U.S. Food and Drug Administration as generally recognized as safe (GRAS).

See also
 Neryl acetate

References

External links
Carcinogenesis Studies of Food Grade Geranyl Acetate

Perfume ingredients
Flavors
Monoterpenes
Acetate esters